Exton may refer to:

People 
Exton (surname)

Places 
 Exton, Somerset, UK
 Exton, Devon, UK
Exton railway station, in Exton, Devon, England
 Exton, Hampshire, UK
 Exton, Rutland, UK
 Exton, Pennsylvania
 Exton Square Mall, a shopping mall in Exton, Pennsylvania
 Main Street at Exton, an open-air shopping mall in Exton, Pennsylvania
 Exton station (Pennsylvania), a train station in Exton, Pennsylvania
 Exton Transportation Center, a bus terminal in Exton, Pennsylvania
 Exton, Tasmania, Australia